Ideological criticism is a method in rhetorical criticism concerned with critiquing texts for the dominant ideology they express while silencing opposing or contrary ideologies. It was started by a group of scholars roughly in the late-1970s through the mid-1980s at universities in the United States. Leading scholars of ideological criticism were Michael Calvin McGee at the University of Iowa and Phillip Wander at San Jose State University. Wander's 1983 article, "The Ideological Turn in Modern Criticism," and his 1984 article, "The Third Persona: An Ideological Turn in Rhetorical Theory," remain two of the most important articles in the field. According to Sonja Foss, “the primary goal of the ideological critic is to discover and make visible the dominant ideology or ideologies embedded in an artifact and the ideologies that are being muted in it.” Foss has also mentioned the contribution to ideological criticism of several theoretical schools, including Marxism, structuralism, cultural studies, and postmodernism.

Ideograph
A unit of analysis in ideological criticism, or what Sonja Foss calls "traces of ideology in an artifact," is the ideograph. It is a symbol representing an ideological concept and is more than what the symbol itself depicts. Michael Calvin McGee, a renowned ideological critic, postulated that an “ideograph is an ordinary term found in political discourse” that “is a high-order abstraction representing collective commitment to a particular but equivocal and ill-defined normative goal”. Thus, McGee restricted ideographs to words, words that “constitute a vocabulary of public motives, which authorize and warrant public actions”. McGee encourages the study of ideographs (such as “liberty” and “freedom”) to help identify the ideological position of a society. He argues such terms are used in discourse as a means of justifying problematic issues within a society. The meaning of an ideograph is defined by a society and its culture and can change over time. Ideographs need not be only positive in nature, but can be negative as well. For example, tyranny and slavery, can “guide behavior and belief negatively by branding unacceptable behavior." McGee notes that to fully understand ideographs, they must be examined both “diachronically” as well as “synchronically.” That is, ideographs need to be examined across time to determine how their meanings may have changed and all ideographs that are used in a given situation must be considered.

Who in democracy would be opposed to actions taken under the auspices of liberty and freedom? To do so would, ideographically speaking, be undemocratic. Citizens of a democratic state are “conditioned” to believe that liberty and freedom are so fundamentally important that society expects those citizens to simply unquestioningly accept actions claiming to be in defense of liberty and freedom. For example, even within the United States, the ideograph of freedom has changed. At the time of the American War of Independence (1775–1783), freedom meant breaking away from the tyrannical rule of the Kingdom of Great Britain. Today, freedom means many things including the freedom to pursue one's dreams and the freedom to be left alone. People disagree about the freedoms that are most important: freedom to possess guns, freedom to make decisions that affect one's body, freedom from fear or violence, and freedom of movement. Depending on one's ideological orientation, the ideograph of freedom represents many things, which is why it can be so powerfully used by politicians. Ideographs succeed in political discourse because of their inability to be concretely understood.

Ideographs need not be verbal only; they can be visual too. In 1997, Janis Edwards and Carol Winkler expanded the idea of the ideograph to include visual images as well as written words. They argue images can act as “a Visual reference point that forms the basis of arguments about a variety of themes and subjects” that are used by both “elites and non-elites” alike. Like McGee's textual ideographs, visual ideographs depict common values and goals in a given culture, recur in different contexts over time, and are used to validate arguments and social practices. Edwards and Winkler mention images of people can act as ideographs too. “In their construct, a person (character) is abstracted and elevated to the status of a cultural figure, and becomes a surface for the articulation of the political character, employing cultural ideals”. Foss identifies the following steps in a piece of ideological criticism: (1) “formulate a research question and select an artifact”; (2) “select a unit of analysis” (which she calls “traces of ideology in an artifact”); (3) “analyze the artifact” (which, according to Foss, involves identifying the ideology in the artifact, analyzing the interests the ideology serves, and uncovering the strategies used in the artifact to promote the ideology); and (4) “write the critical essay”.

References

Sources
Books

 
 

Journals and magazines

 

Criticism
Epistemology
Ideologies
Rhetoric
Political science stubs